Parkhurst is a suburb of Rockhampton in the Rockhampton Region, Queensland, Australia.

Geography
Parkhurst is bounded to the north by Ramsay Creek and to the west by Ramsay Creek and then the Fitzroy River. To the south it is bounded by Limestone Creek (the creek, not the suburb) and by Rockhampton–Yeppoon Road.

A section of the Bruce Highway passes through the centre of the suburb from south to north, while the North Coast railway line also passes through the suburb from south to north, to the west of the highway. The proposed Rockhampton Ring Road will pass through Parkhurst on its way to join the Bruce Highway'

The Parkhurst Industrial Estate is in the south-west of the suburb, while the residential land is in the west near the river and in the north-east of the suburb. Most of Parkhurst remains farmland, but Rockhampton's urban sprawl has led to further residential developments being established throughout Parkhurst including the Northridge, Rosedale, Paramount Park, Riverside and Edenbrook estates.

The increasing population at Parkhurst and in areas further north such as Rockyview and Glendale has led to the construction of the Parkhurst Town Centre, a new shopping centre anchored by a Woolworths supermarket.  Construction of the centre commenced in August 2015.  Woolworths was the first store in open in the centre on 15 November 2016.

The land near the river is prone to flooding. Rockhampton's water treatment facility is located near the river.

Road infrastructure
The Rockhampton-Yeppoon Road (as Yeppoon Road) runs along the south-eastern boundary.

History 
The Glenmore Homestead is one of the earliest in the Rockhampton area, being established in the late 1850s. Land was opened up for settlement and small farms were established.

Parkhurst Provisional School accepted its first enrolments on 11 June 1900. In 1909 it became Parkhurst State School.

Heritage listings

Parkhurst has a number of heritage-listed sites, including:
 Belmont Road: Glenmore Homestead

Education 
Parkhurst State School is a government primary (Prep-6) school for boys and girls at 11 Mason Avenue. In 2014, the school had an enrolment of 308 students with 25 teachers (21 full-time equivalent). At that time, approximately half the children lived outside the suburb and came by school bus from the more rural areas to the north. In 2018, the school had an enrolment of 404 students with 28 teachers (27 full-time equivalent) and 22 non-teaching staff (14 full-time equivalent). It includes a special education program.

There are no secondary schools in Parkhurst. The nearest government secondary school is Glenmore State High School in neighbouring Kawana to the south.

Amenities 
Parkhurst Early Learning Centre is a child care centre and kindergarten in Bean Street established in 1995.  It also provides before-school care, after-school care, and vacation care.

There are a number of parks in the area:

 Alexandra Street Park
 Bill Neven Park

 Boundary Road Park

 John Hegvold Park

 Joseph Harrison Park

 Nuttall Street

 Parkhurst Tennis Club

 Ramsay Creek Park

 Thomas Hilcher Park

 Wade Street Park

Attractions 
Parkhurst is home to the Rockhampton Heritage Village. Located at 296 Boundary Road, this open air museum showcases a range of historic buildings with exhibitions of artefacts from Rockhampton's history. The museum is a venue for local markets and has a large function venue built in the style of a traditional woolshed.

Limestone Creek Environmental Park offers a range of walking tracks in and around Limestone Creek through an open eucalypt forest where wildlife can be seen. It is popular with bird watchers and photographers.

References

Further reading

External links 

 

Suburbs of Rockhampton